Aleksei Viktorovich Ilyin (born 1 May 1958) is a Russian professional football coach and a former player.

Honours
 1977 FIFA World Youth Championship winner with the Soviet Union national under-20 football team (started in all 5 games at the tournament).

External links

References

1958 births
Footballers from Moscow
Living people
Soviet footballers
Russian footballers
Association football defenders
FC Lokomotiv Moscow players
FC Kairat players
FC Elektrometalurh-NZF Nikopol players
FC Tyumen players
NK Veres Rivne players
Soviet Top League players
Ukrainian Premier League players
Russian expatriate footballers
Expatriate footballers in Ukraine
Russian football managers
FC Dynamo Vologda players